The Day of Forever is a collection of science fiction short stories by the British writer J. G. Ballard.

Contents
The Day of Forever contains the following stories:

"The Day of Forever"
"Prisoner of the Coral Deep"
"Tomorrow is a Million Years"
"The Man on the 99th Floor"
"The Waiting Grounds"
"The Last World of Mr Goddard"
"The Gentle Assassin"
"The Sudden Afternoon"
"The Insane Ones"
"The Assassination of John Fitzgerald Kennedy Considered as a Downhill Motor Race"

Cultural references
Grant Morrison has said that the hero of the title story was the major inspiration for his character of Gideon Stargrave.

References

Source

External links

The Terminal Collection: JG Ballard First Editions

1967 short story collections
Short story collections by J. G. Ballard
Panther Books books